Ebru Ceylan (born 26 January 1976) is a Turkish photographer, actress, screenwriter and art director. She is married to collaborator Nuri Bilge Ceylan. 

Ebru Yapıcı was born in Ankara and studied film and television at Marmara University and Mimar Sinan University. The Ceylans starred together in the 2006 film Climates, which they also co-wrote, beginning a writing collaboration that would include Three Monkeys (2008), Once Upon a Time in Anatolia (2011) and the Palme d'Or-winning Winter Sleep (2014).

Nuri Bilge described their writing relationship, which Ebru opted to end after Winter Sleep, saying "Since she is my wife she has the right to say anything. We fight a lot actually, sometimes till the morning, but it's very useful". For Winter Sleep, Ebru received a nomination for the European Film Award for Best Screenwriter.

Ebru resumed her writing collaboration with Nuri Bilge, now with Akin Aksun, for The Wild Pear Tree (2018).

References

External links

Official web site

1976 births
Actresses from Ankara
Living people
Marmara University alumni
Mimar Sinan Fine Arts University alumni
Turkish film actresses
Turkish photographers
Turkish female screenwriters